Hope is a city in southern Dickinson County, Kansas, United States.  As of the 2020 census, the population of the city was 317.

History

Early history

For many millennia, the Great Plains of North America was inhabited by nomadic Native Americans.  From the 16th century to 18th century, the Kingdom of France claimed ownership of large parts of North America.  In 1762, after the French and Indian War, France secretly ceded New France to Spain, per the Treaty of Fontainebleau.

19th century
In 1802, Spain returned most of the land to France.  In 1803, most of the land for modern day Kansas was acquired by the United States from France as part of the 828,000 square mile Louisiana Purchase for 2.83 cents per acre.

In 1854, the Kansas Territory was organized, then in 1861 Kansas became the 34th U.S. state.  In 1857, Dickinson County was established within the Kansas Territory, which included the land for modern day Hope.

In 1871, a group of about forty people, led by Newell Thurstin, began planning a town site in Hope. The town is said to be named after one of Thurstin's sons.

The first post office in Hope was also established in July 1871.

David Jacob Eisenhower, the father of US President Dwight David Eisenhower, lived in a  ranch near Hope from 1878 to his enrollment at Lane University. He and his partner, Milton Good, operated a general store here in 1885.

Hope was incorporated in 1886, and at that time it had a population of over 700, larger than what it is today. The arrival of the railroad one year before, brought access of bustling Chicago to tiny Hope.

In 1887, Atchison, Topeka and Santa Fe Railway built a branch line from Neva (3 miles west of Strong City) through Hope to Superior, Nebraska.  In 1996, the Atchison, Topeka and Santa Fe Railway merged with Burlington Northern Railroad and renamed to the current BNSF Railway.  Most locals still refer to this railroad as the "Santa Fe".

The motto of Hope is "There Will Always Be Hope In Kansas", which is also the name of a song.

Geography
Hope is located at  (38.689536, -97.076815).

There are two parks in Hope: one in the downtown area on Main Street and an older one in the northern edge of town.

Climate
The climate in this area is characterized by hot, humid summers and generally mild to cool winters.  According to the Köppen Climate Classification system, Hope has a humid subtropical climate, abbreviated "Cfa" on climate maps.

Demographics

2010 census
As of the census of 2010, there were 368 people, 166 households, and 104 families residing in the city. The racial makeup of the city was 93.5% White, 2.4% African American, 0.8% Native American, 0.3% Asian, and 3.0% from two or more races. Hispanic or Latino of any race were 0.3% of the population.

There were 166 households, of which 22.9% had children under the age of 18 living with them, 54.2% were married couples living together, 6.0% had a female householder with no husband present, 2.4% had a male householder with no wife present, and 37.3% were non-families. 33.7% of all households were made up of individuals, and 18.7% had someone living alone who was 65 years of age or older. The average household size was 2.22 and the average family size was 2.81.

The median age in the city was 48.7 years. 19.8% of residents were under the age of 18; 6.9% were between the ages of 18 and 24; 16.3% were from 25 to 44; 34% were from 45 to 64; and 23.1% were 65 years of age or older. The gender makeup of the city was 49.7% male and 50.3% female.

2000 census
As of the census of 2000, there were 372 people, 164 households, and 106 families residing in the city. The racial makeup of the city was 98.12% White, 0.81% African American, 0.54% Native American, 0.27% Asian, and 0.27% from two or more races. Hispanic or Latino of any race were 0.27% of the population.

There were 164 households, out of which 29.9% had children under the age of 18 living with them, 57.3% were married couples living together, 5.5% had a female householder with no husband present, and 34.8% were non-families. 32.9% of all households were made up of individuals, and 21.3% had someone living alone who was 65 years of age or older. The average household size was 2.27 and the average family size was 2.88.

In the city, the population was spread out, with 24.5% under the age of 18, 3.8% from 18 to 24, 25.3% from 25 to 44, 24.2% from 45 to 64, and 22.3% who were 65 years of age or older. The median age was 43 years. For every 100 females, there were 84.2 males. For every 100 females age 18 and over, there were 82.5 males.

The median income for a household in the city was $28,365, and the median income for a family was $32,813. Males had a median income of $27,639 versus $18,036 for females. The per capita income for the city was $14,300. About 4.8% of families and 7.4% of the population were below the poverty line, including 4.6% of those under age 18 and 14.0% of those age 65 or over.

Government
The Hope government consists of a mayor and five council members.  The council meets the 2nd Wednesday of each month at 7 pm while in daylight savings and 6pm during standard time.  The current mayor is Larry Ryff.

Education
The community is served by Rural Vista USD 481 public school district.

Transportation
Hope is located on K-4, the longest highway in the state. It was once at the junction of the BNSF and Missouri Pacific railroads, but is no longer served by either Railroad.

Notable people
 Edgar Eisenhower, brother of President Dwight D. Eisenhower, was born in Hope, Kansas.
 Don Ihde, philosopher, was born in Hope, Kansas, in 1934.

See also
 Hope Township, Dickinson County, Kansas

References

Further reading

External links

 City of Hope
 Hope – Directory of Public Officials
 Historic Images of Hope, Special Photo Collections at Wichita State University Library.
 Hope city map, KDOT

Cities in Kansas
Cities in Dickinson County, Kansas
Populated places established in 1871
1871 establishments in Kansas